is the name used by Kyushu Railway Company (JR Kyushu) for the limited express train service operating between Hakata and Ōita via Kokura and Beppu along the Kagoshima Main Line and Nippō Main Line in Kyushu, Japan. It runs every 30 minutes at a speed of  - with a journey time of approximately 2 hours.

Rolling stock

Services are operated by a fleet of eight 7-car 883 series electric multiple unit (EMU) trains and eleven 6-car 885 series White Sonic EMUs. 
 883 series EMUs (8 x 7-car) - Since 1997
 885 series EMUs (11 x 6-car) - Since 2001
Most services are operated by renovated 883 series trains including a panoramic lounge area located in the Green Car (first class).

History
 20 April 1995: New 883 series Sonic EMUs are introduced on Nichirin limited express services between Hakata and Ōita, and named Sonic Nichirin.
 22 March 1997: Nichirin and Sonic Nichirin services are combined to become Sonic services operated entirely by 883 series EMUs.
 3 March 2001: New 5-car 885 series White Sonic are introduced on Sonic services.
 15 March 2003: 885 series White Sonic sets lengthened from 5 to 6 cars, allowing interchangeability with 885 series White Kamome sets.
 18 March 2007: All cars become non-smoking.
 19 July 2008: The three 5-car 883 series sets are augmented to 7 cars.

See also
 List of named passenger trains of Japan

References

 "JR Timetable" March 2008 issue

External links
JR Kyushu website

Kyushu Railway Company
Named passenger trains of Japan
Railway services introduced in 1997
1997 establishments in Japan